Bilangin ang Bituin sa Langit is a 2020 Philippine television drama series broadcast by GMA Network. It aired on the network's Afternoon Prime line up and worldwide on GMA Pinoy TV from February 24, 2020, to March 26, 2021, replacing Madrasta.

Series overview

Episodes

References

Lists of Philippine drama television series episodes